The Battle of Shahi Tibbi was fought between the Khalsa led by Bhai Jiwan Singh and the Mughal Empire led by Wazir Khan. This battle was fought alongside the Battle of Sarsa.

The Guru had just left Anandpur Sahib after being besieged there for over 8 months. He got attacked near the Sarsa river. Bhai Udai Singh quickly gathered 50 men in order to defend the Guru crossing the river. They all fought valiantly until there was one man left.

References

Battles involving the Sikhs
Battles involving the Mughal Empire
Conflicts in 1704